ButterflyMX is an American property technology company that specializes in smartphone-based access control. ButterflyMX’s hardware offerings include video intercom systems and keypads that users can manage through a mobile application.

History 

ButterflyMX was founded in 2014 in New York City by Cyrus Claffey, Matthew Knoff, Kunal Shah, and Ivan Mihalj to address difficulties in traditionally wired intercom usage, installation, and administration. In 2014, ButterflyMX received the People’s Choice Award from the National Multifamily Housing Council, and by 2018 ButterflyMX had secured $5.5 million in funding. 

In 2018, ButterflyMX began to expand internationally, appearing in access control markets in Europe and South America. After this period of growth, ButterflyMX raised an additional $35 million from investors in September 2020. This group of investors included Stifel Financial, Egis Capital, and Zillow co-founder Spencer Rascoff.

Leadership 
ButterflyMX is managed by CEO Aaron Rudenstine and Executive Chairman Cyrus Claffey.

See also 
 List of tech companies in the New York metropolitan area

References

External links 

Mobile video intercoms

 2014 establishments in New York City
 Technology companies established in 2014
 Access control
 Security technology